Andreyevka is a rural locality (a village) in Yanaulsky District, Bashkortostan, Russia. The population was 25 as of 2010.

References 

Rural localities in Yanaulsky District